The men's 4 x 800 metres relay at the 2015 IAAF World Relays was held at the Thomas Robinson Stadium on 2 May.

Records
Prior to the competition, the records were as follows:

Schedule

Summary
Kenya's Alfred Kipketer started off fast, chased by USA's Duane Solomon, with Kipketer holding the advantage at the handoff, the 1:47 pace three seconds slower than Kipketer's PR at the time and five seconds slower than Solomon's.  Kenya's second runner Nicholas Kipkoech pushed the pace followed by American Erik Sowinski as the two teams separated from the field.  With 200 metres to go, Sowinski passed Kipkoech who ran out of gas, Sowinski sprinting the final straightaway to put a 20 metre gap on Kipkoech pulling away.  Poland's Kamil Gurdak was also gaining rapidly on Kipkoech.  Sowinski's split was a more competitive 1:44.7.  Lined up for the handoff, Timothy Kitum became alarmed at his teammate losing ground and bounced backward down the straightaway to grab the baton as Casimir Loxsom sprinted away.  Loxsom ran another high 1:44 split to hand off to Robby Andrews with a 35 metre lead, while Poland put their best two runners last, Marcin Lewandowski closing down on Kitum to within 3 metres.  Kenya's Jeremiah Mutai took off in chase of Andrews, ignoring Poland's European Champion Adam Kszczot.  Over the next 650 metres, Mutai closed down the lead to a manageable 10 metres, but Andrews is a kicker, almost serving as a cruel decoy, Andrews sprinted away from a dejected Mutai to retain the huge lead he had started with.  With Kszczot sprinting from behind, Mutai barely crossed the line in second place with Australia a distant fourth.

After the race, Kenya was disqualified for Kitum wandering out of the passing zone.  USA's time of 7:04.84 was also the Championship record.

Results

Final
The final was started at 20:13.

References

4 x 800 metres relay
4 × 800 metres relay